Chaudhary Nitiraj Singh (13 February 1909–28 October 1988) was an Indian politician belonging to the Indian National Congress. He was elected to the Lower House of Parliament the Lok Sabha from Narmadapuram, Madhya Pradesh, India in 1967 and 1971. He was the Minister of state for Petroleum and Chemicals and Mines and Metals from June 1970 to May 1971 and was later the Minister of State for Law & Justice in the Indira Gandhi Government.

References

External links
Official biographical sketch in Parliament of India website

India MPs 1967–1970
India MPs 1971–1977
Indian National Congress politicians
Law Ministers of India
1909 births
1988 deaths
Indian National Congress politicians from Madhya Pradesh